Sorie Ibrahim Koroma (April 14, 1927 – April 30, 1994) commonly known as S.I. Koroma was a Sierra Leonean politician, labor activist, and one of the founding members of the All People's Congress political party. He served as first Vice President of Sierra Leone from April 19, 1971 to retirement on November 28, 1985 under president Siaka Stevens. 

Sorie Ibrahim Koroma was a close personal friend of president Siaka Stevens; and was one of the closest and must trusted political advisors to president Stevens. To date, S.I. Koroma is widely considered the most influential vice president in Sierra Leone's history.

Early years
One of Sierra Leone’s most vibrant political figures, Sorie Ibrahim Koroma was born in Port Loko, Maforki Chiefdom, Port Loko District in the Northern province of British Sierra Leone. He was one of the 13TH member's of the APC after it was formed on March 20th 1960. Sorie Ibrahim Koroma's father was a member of the Mandingo ethnic group of Guinean descent, and he died when Koroma was just a little boy. After the death of his father, his mother, Ya Iye Wureh, married to an ethnic Temne chief named Bai Bockarie Dumbuya, the nephew of Alikali Mela (who was then Paramount Chief of Port Loko District). 

Koroma was raised in the Dumbuya family household instead of the Koroma family compound at Sendugu Chief, Port Loko District, an area dominated by ethnic Mandingo and Susu. Though raised in a Temne home, SI Koroma never forgot his Mandingo heritage and he was also fluent in the Mandingo language. 

Alikali Mela made his nephew Bockari Dumbuya a sub chief, conferring him the title “Or Sultan.” Alikali Mela also crowned SI’s mother a chief, giving her the title of “Ya Alimamy.” That was how Sorie Ibrahim Koroma, the only child to his mother, became a member of two important ruling families in Port Loko – the Bangura and Dumbuya families.

Education
SI Koroma was educated at the Government Model Primary School in Freetown and received his secondary education at the Bo School in Bo. He went to Bo school at a time when it was an institution exclusively for individuals belonging to ruling families in the provinces. 

After completing his secondary education, S I Koroma, who had a fierce determination to succeed in life, landed a job with the Sierra Leone Government Co-operative Department. He worked there from 1951 to 1958 and took a course during that period at the Cooperative College, Ibadan, Nigeria. On his return home, he resigned from Government Service to set up his own private business. He fared well in the transportation business and within a short time became Secretary General of the Sierra Leone Motor Transport Union.

Formation of the APC and Parliament
In 1960, he was member of the All People's Congress (APC), which has since been one of the premier political parties in the country. In 1962, Koroma was elected as a Member of Parliament to the Parliament of Sierra Leone representing a district of Freetown, to which he was re-elected in the 1967 election

Cabinet positions

After the 1967 coup d'état by David Lansana and the return to civilian control in 1968, Koroma became the Minister of Trade and Industry in Siaka Stevens' first cabinet. From 1968 until 1985, Koroma served various functions in the government, including Minister of Agriculture and Natural Resources (1969–1971), Vice-President (1971–1985) and Prime Minister (1971–1975), Minister of Finance (1975–1978). He would continue in that position until 1978, when he was appointed First Vice-President after the APC declared itself the only legal party. Koroma was the First Vice President until he retired from politics. He went to care more directly for his palm oil plantation near his birthplace in Port Loko.

References

 "Sierra Leonean Heroes: Fifty Men and Women Who Helped to Build Our Nation", 1988

1930 births
Vice-presidents of Sierra Leone
Prime Ministers of Sierra Leone
Agriculture ministers of Sierra Leone
Finance ministers of Sierra Leone
Trade ministers of Sierra Leone
Industry ministers of Sierra Leone
Members of the Parliament of Sierra Leone
Temne people
1997 deaths
All People's Congress politicians
People from Port Loko District
Sierra Leonean Mandingo people
Sierra Leonean people of Guinean descent